Plerandra veitchii is a species of plant in the family Araliaceae. It is endemic to New Caledonia.  It is threatened by habitat loss.

References

Endemic flora of New Caledonia
Veitch Nurseries
Endangered plants
Taxonomy articles created by Polbot
Taxa named by Élie-Abel Carrière